The 2008 Havant Borough Council election took place on 1 May 2008 to elect members of Havant Borough Council in Hampshire, England. One third of the council was up for election and the Conservative Party stayed in overall control of the council.

After the election, the composition of the council was:
Conservative 32
Labour 3
Liberal Democrats 3

Background
Before the election the Conservatives ran the council with 31 of the 38 seats. 14 seats were contested at the election with a total of 55 candidates standing at the election. As well as full slates from the Conservatives, Labour and Liberal Democrats, there were 9 candidates from the UK Independence Party and 2 each from the Green party and the English Democrats.

Election result
The Conservatives increased their majority on the council after Mike Sceal took a seat in Warren Park ward from Labour. This took the Conservatives to 32 seats, while Labour dropped to 3 seats on the council. Meanwhile, Liberal Democrat Faith Ponsonby held a seat in Battins ward to keep the Liberal Democrats having 3 councillors. Overall turnout at the election was 32.2%.

Ward results

Barncroft

Battins

Bedhampton

Bondfields

Cowplain

Emsworth

Hart Plain

Hayling East

Hayling West

Purbrook

St Faiths

Stakes

Warren Park

Waterloo

By-elections between 2008 and 2010
A by-election was held in Waterloo ward on 4 September 2008 after the death of councillor Wendy Brown. The seat was narrowly held for the Conservatives by Ray Bastin with a majority of 48 votes over the Liberal Democrats.

References

2008 English local elections
Havant Borough Council elections
2000s in Hampshire